The 1997 Trans-Am Series was the 32nd season of the Sports Car Club of America's Trans-Am Series. Tommy Kendall nearly swept the series, winning all but the final two rounds. Ford swept the series, with Kendall and Borkowski both driving Mustangs.

Results

References

Trans-Am Series
Trans-Am